Jacob Erastus Davis (October 31, 1905 – February 28, 2003) was a Democratic member of the U.S. House of Representatives from Ohio. He served a single term from 1941 to 1943.

Early life and career 
Jacob E. Davis was born in Beaver, Ohio.  He graduated from Beaver High School in 1923.  He received his A.B. from Ohio State University in Columbus, Ohio, in 1927, and J.D. from Harvard University in Cambridge, Massachusetts, in 1930.  He worked as a lawyer in private practice, and served as prosecuting attorney of Pike County, Ohio, from 1931 to 1935.  He was a member of the Ohio House of Representatives from 1935 to 1937, serving as speaker pro tempore and majority floor leader in 1937.  He was common pleas judge of Pike County, Ohio, from 1937 to 1940.

Congress 
Davis was elected as a Democrat to the Seventy-seventh Congress.  He was an unsuccessful candidate for reelection to the Seventy-eighth Congress in 1942.

Later career and death 
He was special assistant to the United States Secretary of the Navy from 1943 to 1944.  He was vice president of Kroger Company of Cincinnati, Ohio, from 1945 to 1960 and president and CEO  from 1961 to 1970.

He died on February 28, 2003, in Naples, Florida.  Interment in Spring Grove Mausoleum in Cincinnati, Ohio.

References

The Political Graveyard

1905 births
2003 deaths
County district attorneys in Ohio
Harvard Law School alumni
Kroger
Democratic Party members of the Ohio House of Representatives
Ohio lawyers
Democratic Party members of the United States House of Representatives from Ohio
Ohio state court judges
Ohio State University alumni
People from Beaver, Ohio
Politicians from Cincinnati
20th-century American politicians
20th-century American judges
20th-century American lawyers